Colin may refer to:
 Colin (given name)
 Colin (surname)
 Colin (film), a 2008 Cannes film festival zombie movie
 Colin (horse) (1905–1932), thoroughbred racehorse
 Colin (humpback whale), a humpback whale calf abandoned north of Sydney, Australia, in August 2008
 Colin (river), a river in France
 Colin (security robot), in Mostly Harmless of The Hitchhiker's Guide to the Galaxy series by Douglas Adams 
 Tropical Storm Colin (disambiguation)

See also
Collin (disambiguation)
Kolin (disambiguation)
Colyn